The San Francisco Bay Area Curling Club (SFBACC) is a non-profit corporation serving the needs for the play and development of the sport of curling in the San Francisco Bay Area and its surrounding outskirts. Headquartered in Oakland, California, it is the largest curling club in California as well as in the Mountain Pacific Curling Association.

The San Francisco Bay Area Curling Club is a registered non-profit corporation in the state of California. The SFBACC is a member of the Mountain Pacific Curling Association and also of the United States Curling Association.

History 

The San Francisco Bay Area Curling Club (SFBACC) was founded March 13, 1958 in Mountain View, California. In the club's early years, it had a dedicated curling facility called the Peninsula Curling Rink. By the early 1970's the dedicated facility was closed and the club was curling on arena ice. 

Starting in 1994 the SFBACC began curling at Solar4America Ice at San Jose, renting ice for short seasons until 2006 when regular league times were established. Also in 2006 the club expanded to nearby Fremont to begin curling at Solar4America Ice at Fremont. With interest in the sport continuing to grow throughout the San Francisco Bay Area the club expanded again in the summer of 2009 to Oakland.

From 2009 to 2018 the club conducted activities at the three separate locations in San Jose, Fremont, and Oakland. In early 2018 the SFBACC allowed the newly formed Silicon Valley Curling Club (SVCC) to take over all curling activities at Solar4America at San Jose and Solar4America at Fremont.

Oakland Ice Center 
Prior to 2018, the SFBACC curled at Oakland Ice Center, located in the city's Uptown district. The rink is owned by the city of Oakland and operated by Sharks Ice, LLC. As of December 2019, the club's affiliation with the Oakland Ice Center had ended.

Current facilities 
In March 2022, the club opened a new 5-sheet dedicated facility in East Oakland.

Events 

The SFBACC has hosted the Golden Gate Bonspiel annually each spring during Memorial Day weekend since 2008. The tournament was previously held at Solar4America Ice at Fremont and will held at the new dedicated facility in Oakland moving forward. 

The club teaches Learn-to-Curl events throughout the year to expose new people to the sport. During the Winter Olympic Games interest is especially high and so the club hosts numerous Learn-to-Curl events, lesson series, and instructional leagues to teach thousands of people. 

In October 2013 the SFBACC played host to the World Curling Federation Olympic Celebration Tour, which brought 2010 Olympic silver medalist Carolyn McRorie to Oakland to participate in multiple clinics.

Competitive titles 

2013 USCA Arena Curling Women's National Championship - Silver Medal
2014 USCA Arena Curling Women's National Championship - Bronze Medal
2015 USCA Arena Curling Women's National Championship - Gold Medal
2016 USCA Arena Curling Women's National Championship - Gold Medal
2017 USCA Arena Curling Women's National Championship - Bronze Medal
2018 USCA Arena Curling Men's National Championship - Silver Medal

References

External links 
Official San Francisco Bay Area Curling Club Website
San Francisco Bay Area Curling Club Dedicated Ice Website.
Golden Gate Bonspiel
Mountain Pacific Curling Association
United States Curling Association

Curling clubs in the United States
Curling clubs established in 1958
Sports teams in San Francisco
1958 establishments in California
Curling in California
Sports in Oakland, California